The fear of crime refers to the fear of being a victim of crime as opposed to the actual probability of being a victim of crime. 
The fear of crime, along with fear of the streets and the fear of youth, is said to have been in Western culture for "time immemorial". While fear of crime can be differentiated into public feelings, thoughts and behaviors about the personal risk of criminal victimization, distinctions can also be made between the tendency to see situations as fearful, the actual experience while in those situations, and broader expressions about the cultural and social significance of crime and symbols of crime in people's neighborhoods and in their daily, symbolic lives.

Importantly, feelings, thoughts and behaviors can have a number of functional and dysfunctional effects on individual and group life, depending on actual risk and people's subjective approaches to danger. On a negative side, they can erode public health and psychological well-being; they can alter routine activities and habits; they can contribute to some places turning into 'no-go' areas via a withdrawal from community; and they can drain community cohesion, trust and neighborhood stability. Some degree of emotional response can be healthy: psychologists have long highlighted the fact that some degree of worry can be a problem-solving activity, motivating care and precaution, underlining the distinction between low-level anxieties that motivate caution and counter-productive worries that damage well-being.

Factors influencing the fear of crime include the psychology of risk perception, circulating representations of the risk of victimization (chiefly via interpersonal communication and the mass media), public perceptions of neighborhood stability and breakdown, the influence of neighbourhood context, and broader factors where anxieties about crime express anxieties about the pace and direction of social change. There are also some wider cultural influences. For example, some have argued that modern times have left people especially sensitive to issues of safety and insecurity.

Affective aspects of fear of crime
The core aspect of fear of crime is the range of emotions that is provoked in citizens by the possibility of victimization. While people may feel angry and outraged about the extent and prospect of crime, surveys typically ask people "who they are afraid of" and "how worried they are". Underlying the answers that people give are (more often than not) two dimensions of 'fear': (a) those everyday moments of worry that transpire when one feels personally threatened; and (b) some more diffuse or 'ambient' anxiety about risk. While standard measures of worry about crime regularly show between 30% and 50% of the population of England and Wales express some kind of worry about falling victim, probing reveals that few individuals actually worry for their own safety on an everyday basis. One thus can distinguish between fear (an emotion, a feeling of alarm or dread caused by an awareness or expectation of danger) and some broader anxiety. Some people may be more willing to admit their worries and vulnerabilities than others.

Cognitive aspects of fear of crime
Concern about crime can be differentiated from perceptions of the risk of personal victimization (i.e. cognitive aspects of fear of crime). Concern about crime includes public assessments of the size of the crime problem. An example of a question that could be asked is whether crime has increased, decreased or stayed the same in a certain period (and/or in a certain area, for instance the respondents own neighborhood). Between 1972 and 2001, the Gallup Poll shows that American respondents think crime has decreased. By contrast, the cognitive side of fear of crime includes public perceptions of the likelihood of falling victim, public senses of control over the possibility, and public estimations of the seriousness of the consequences of crime. People who feel especially vulnerable to victimization are likely to feel that they are especially likely to be targeted by criminals (i.e. victimization is likely), that they are unable to control the possibility (i.e. they have low self-efficacy), and that the consequences would be especially severe. Additionally, these three different components of risk perception may interact: the impact of perceived likelihood on subsequent emotional response (worry, fear, anxiety, etc.) is likely to be especially strong among those who feel that consequences are high and self-efficacy is low.

Behavioral aspects of fear of crime
A third way to measure fear of crime is to ask people whether they ever avoid certain areas, protect certain objects or take preventive measures. This way, measuring fear of crime can become a relatively straightforward thing, because the questions asked tap into actual behavior and 'objective' facts, such as the amount of money spent on a burglar-alarm or extra locks. Although, some researchers such as Jesse Omoregie argue that measuring fear of crime can be problematic as there are various factors like social desirability effects, respondents downplaying or over-exaggerating their fear which can affect the reliability of data. Some degree of 'fear' might be healthy for some people, creating a 'natural defence' against crime. In short, when the risk of crime is real, a specific level of 'fear' might actually be 'functional': worry about crime might stimulate precaution which then makes people feel safer and lowers their risk of crime. The fear of crime is a very important feature in criminology.

The influence of public perceptions of neighborhood breakdown and stability
Perhaps the biggest influence on fear of crime is public concern about neighbourhood disorder, social cohesion and collective efficacy. The incidence and risk of crime has become linked with perceived problems of social stability, moral consensus, and the collective informal control processes that underpin the social order of a neighborhood. Such 'day-to-day' issues ('young people hanging around', 'poor community spirit', 'low levels of trust and cohesion') produce information about risk and generate a sense of unease, insecurity and distrust in the environment (incivilities signal a lack of conventional courtesies and low-level social order in public places). Moreover, many people express through their fear of crime some broader concerns about neighbourhood breakdown, the loss of moral authority, and the crumbling of civility and social capital.

People can come to different conclusions about the same social and physical environment: two individuals who live next door to each other and share the same neighbourhood can view local disorder quite differently. Why might people have different levels of tolerance or sensitivity to these potentially ambiguous cues? UK research has suggested that broader social anxieties about the pace and direction of social change may shift levels of tolerance to ambiguous stimuli in the environment. Individuals who hold more authoritarian views about law and order, and who are especially concerned about a long-term deterioration of community, may be more likely to perceive disorder in their environment (net of the actual conditions of that environment). They may also be more likely to link these physical cues to problems of social cohesion and consensus, of declining quality of social bonds and informal social control.

Interpersonal communication and the mass media

Hearing about events and knowing others who have been victimised are thought to raise perceptions of the risk of victimisation. This has been described as a 'crime multiplier', or processes operating in the residential environment that would 'spread' the impacts of criminal events. Such evidence exists that hearing of friends' or neighbours' victimisation increases anxiety that indirect experiences of crime may play a stronger role in anxieties about victimisation than direct experience. However, there is a cautionary note: '… many residents of a neighbourhood only know of [crime] indirectly via channels that may inflate, deflate, or garble the picture.' A subject's criminal risk perception is exaggerated by peer-communication on crime and only moderated by the own experience. In other words a person may have never witnessed any crime in a one frequented area, and yet perceive the place as high risk. 

Public perceptions of the risk of crime are no doubt also strongly shaped by mass media coverage. Individuals pick up from media and interpersonal communication circulating images of the criminal event - the perpetrators, victims, motive, and representations of consequential, uncontrollable, and sensational crimes. The notion of 'stimulus similarity' may be key: if the reader of a newspaper identifies with the described victim, or feels that their own neighbourhood bears resemblance to the one described, then the image of risk may be taken up, personalised and translated into personal safety concerns.

Yet the relationship between fear of crime and mass media is unclear, at least in its causal ordering. To put the dilemma in simple terms: do people fear crime because a lot of crime is being shown on television, or does television just provide footage about crimes because people fear crime and want to see what's going on? The complex nature of crime could allow the media to exploit social naivety, covering crime not only selective, but also distorting the everyday world of crime. Some say the media contribute to the climate of fear that is created, because the actual frequency of victimisation is a tiny fraction of potential crime.

Crime is estimated to be accounting for up to 25 % of news coverage, the quality and angle of the coverage becomes an issue, on the other hand the victimisation rate is 10 or 20 fold less than 25 % in the M The media displays violent crime disproportionately, whilst neglecting minor crimes. The reality is violent crime has been declining in the past 10 years The profile of offenders in the media is distorted, causing misunderstanding of criminal offending.

Unfortunately, despite an abundant literature on media effects – particularly the 'mean world' hypothesis – little work has been done into how representations, imagery and symbols of crime circulate in society, transmitted and transformed by multiple actors with a wide array of effects, only to translate into personal fears about crime. Perhaps future work will take account of the transmission mechanisms through which representations, beliefs and attitudes about societal risks are propagated in different social and cultural contexts.

Fear of crime as socially constructed

Fear of crime can also be understood from a social constructionist perspective. The term and concept of fear of crime did not, for example, enter the public or political lexicon until the mid-1960s. That is not to say individuals did not fear crime victimization prior to this period, clearly they did at various points in history to varying degrees. However it demonstrates that fear of crime only became part of a political economy when researchers began to measure and analyse it under the auspice of The US President's Commission on Law Enforcement and the Administration of Justice which reported in 1967 Once fear of crime had a name it could be deployed as a political tactic in a law and order politics. It also became something that citizens could experience as an emotional response to the threat of victimisation. The formation of a 'fear of crime feedback loop' then allowed more citizens to be surveyed as fearful, more politicians to be able to use crime fear as a political issue, security products to be sold on the back of crime fear and so on in an ever-increasing spiral that popularised crime fear. Moreover, once citizens were seen as being motivated by concerns about crime fear of crime could be used as a responsibilising technique to activate citizens to conduct themselves or consume products in ways that reduce their vulnerability to crime victimisation. This approach to understanding fear of crime does not deny the experiences of individuals who fear crime victimisation but suggests that such experiences have to be understood as being intimately connected to broader socio-political contexts.

See also 
 Women's fear of crime
Public Criminology

External links
"Fear of Crime and Perceived Risk." Oxford Bibliographies Online: Criminology.
"FBI Violent Crime Report for 2010." FBI Homepage Online.

References

Other references 
 

Criminology
Crime
Social constructionism